Goodenia quadrilocularis is a species of flowering plant in the family Goodeniaceae and is endemic to south-coastal areas in the south-west of Western Australia. It is an erect, woody perennial herb with egg-shaped to lance-shaped leaves with toothed edges, and racemes of yellow flowers.

Description

Taxonomy and naming
Goodenia quadrilocularis was first formally described in 1810 by Robert Brown in his Prodromus Florae Novae Hollandiae et Insulae Van Diemen. The specific epithet (quadrilocularis) refers to the four locules of the fruit.

Distribution and habitat
This goodenia grows on sand dunes and granite outcrops mostly near Cape Le Grand.

Conservation status
Goodenia quadrilocularisis classified as "Priority Two" by the Western Australian Government Department of Parks and Wildlife meaning that it is poorly known and from only one or a few locations.

References

quadrilocularis
Eudicots of Western Australia
Plants described in 1810
Taxa named by Robert Brown (botanist, born 1773)
Endemic flora of Australia